Joseph Le Boubennec (born 25 February 1892, date of death unknown) was a French racing cyclist. He rode in the 1926 Tour de France.

References

1892 births
Year of death missing
French male cyclists
Place of birth missing